Paul Valdemar Horsdal,  (born 1 September 1945), commonly known as Valdy, is a Canadian folk and country musician whose solo career began in the early 1970s. He is known for "Rock and Roll Song", his first mainstream single. Valdy is the winner of two Juno Awards for Folk Singer of the Year and Folk Entertainer of the Year, and has received seven additional Juno nominations. His fourteen albums, including four which are certified gold, have achieved sales of nearly half a million copies.

Early life and education
Valdy was born and grew up in Ottawa, Ontario, the third child of Danish portrait photographer Paul Horsdal and Lillian Horsdal (née West), an English nurse and writer. He studied guitar and piano, and attended Lisgar Collegiate Institute.

Career

Early career
Valdy was a member of The London Towne Criers during the 1960s and subsequently joined Montreal band The Prodigal Sons.  He then moved to Victoria, where he worked with various rock and country musicians, including Blake Emmons.

When he was 25 Valdy bought several acres of land in Sooke, BC and began farming. He began performing as a solo artist, and in 1972 recorded his "Rock and Roll Song" on Haida/A&M; it became a hit. His music was featured in the 1972 Steve McQueen film The Getaway. In 1973 he won a Juno Award for Outstanding Folk Performance.

Valdy recorded a live album, Family Gathering, through A&M; it was recorded at Massey Hall in Toronto and released in 1974.

Valdy appeared on the CBC TV show The Beachcombers as the environmental activist "Halibut" Stu.  He also secured a part in the reunion production of The New Beachcombers performing a song he wrote, "It's The Water," as part of a jug band.

1980s
In 1986, Valdy made a guest appearance as himself in the popular 1980's Canadian children's television show, Today's Special (episode entitled: "trash"). He also guest appeared as himself on Sharon, Lois & Bram's Elephant Show in the third season episode titled "Growing Up".

2000s
In 2000 Valdy released the album Contenders with country musician Gary Fjellgaard. He continued to tour with Fjellgaard for many years.

Valdy recorded 2003's Viva Valdy: Live at Last during the Rack-On-Tour. On 21 November 2005, Valdy was awarded the National Achievement Award by SOCAN at the 2005 SOCAN Awards in Toronto.

2010s
Valdy was appointed a member of the Order of Canada in June 2011.
In 2012, he released his 18th album, Read Between the Lines, and toured across Canada in support.

In 2013 Valdy toured in Canada with New Zealand guitarist Graham Wardrop. In 2014 he continued to perform at folk festivals, including Kingsville Folk with jazz pianist Karel Roessingh and Nadina Mackie-Jackson on bassoon.

As of 2018, Valdy continues to regularly tour across Canada, including a performance on the main stage at the Mariposa Folk Festival.

Personal

Married (1986) to Kathleen Fraser Horsdal, a teacher, hospice worker and song cowriter. His daughter Chelah Horsdal is an actress.

Discography

Albums

Singles

References

External links
 Valdy's website
 CanConRox entry
 The Canadian Encyclopedia: Valdy
 

1945 births
Living people
Canadian folk singer-songwriters
Canadian country singer-songwriters
Canadian male singer-songwriters
Juno Award winners
Musicians from Ottawa
Musicians from British Columbia
Members of the Order of Canada
Lisgar Collegiate Institute alumni
Stony Plain Records artists
A&M Records artists